Sit is an uninhabited Croatian island in the Adriatic Sea located between Žut and Pašman.

The coastline is not significantly indented, except for the bay Pahaljica (Čitapićev port) to the north of the island. Its middle width of 500 m consists of only one mountain ridge, where the highest elevation Veli vrh (84 m.a.s.l.) is located in the eastern part of the island, the central hill Vlašić is 78 m.a.s.l., and the northwest end Borovac is 60 m.a.s.l.

References

Sources

External links
 Ferry Marko Polo Stranded on the Island near Sibenik, Croatia
 Make 25 Knots, Then Sit

Islands of the Adriatic Sea
Islands of Croatia
Uninhabited islands of Croatia
Landforms of Šibenik-Knin County